Cherednik or Cherednyk (Чередник) is a Russian surname. Notable people with the surname include:
Ivan Cherednik Mathematician
Cherednik algebra
Oleksiy Cherednyk Football player
Yuri Cherednik, Volleyball player

Russian-language surnames